The R292 road is a regional road in Ireland that runs from Sligo town via Strandhill to Ballysadare, all in County Sligo.  A more direct road from Sligo to Ballysadare is available using the N4 road.

The Urban Cycle Sligo travel scheme route 001 links Strandhill to Sligo Town with dedicated cycle lanes created on the R292 road. The road loops around the coast of the Coolera Peninsula.

See also
Roads in Ireland
National primary road
National secondary road

References
Roads Act 1993 (Classification of Regional Roads) Order 2006 – Department of Transport

Notes

Regional roads in the Republic of Ireland
Roads in County Sligo